Stephen Patrick Sinko (September 14, 1909 – March 1, 1999) was an American football player and coach.  He played professionally as a guard and tackle in the National Football League (NFL) for the Boston Redskins from 1934 to 1936 and the Los Angeles Bulldogs from 1937 to 1938. Sinko served as the head football coach at Boston University from 1957 to 1963, compiling a record of 23–36–3.

Background
Sinko was born and raised in Chisholm, Minnesota, where he graduated from the local high school. He attended Duquesne University, where he played college football for the Duquesne Dukes.

Professional career
Following college, Sinko played professionally for the Boston Redskins for three season, from 1934 to 1936, before moving to the Los Angeles Bulldogs for two seasons, 1937 to 1938. In 1939, he took an assistant coaching position under Aldo Donelli at Duquesne University. In 1941, the two served as head coach and line coach of the NFL's Pittsburgh Steelers.

During World War II, Sinko served as a pilot in the United States Navy. During his service, he was a coach for the Iowa Pre-Flight Seahawks football team. In early 1946, Sinko was hired as an assistant coach for the Miami Seahawks of the All-America Football Conference AAFC). In June of that year, he was signed as head football  coach at Duquesne University, only to serve in that capacity until December 1946, when he quit to once again become an assistant to Aldo Donelli, this time at Boston University.

In 1949, Sinko was named as assistant to Clyde B. Smith at Indiana University. Sinko return to Boston University in 1951, once again assisting Donelli before succeeding him as head football coach in 1957. Sinko served as the head football coach at Boston University from 1957 to 1963, compiling a record of 23–36–3. He was succeeded as head coach by Warren Schmakel.

Honors and death
Sinko was inducted into the Duquesne Dukes Hall of Fame in 1988. He died on March 1, 1999, at Cape Cod Hospital in Hyannis, Massachusetts.

Head coaching record

References

External links
 
 

1909 births
1999 deaths
American football guards
American football tackles
Boston Redskins players
Boston University Terriers football coaches
Duquesne Dukes football coaches
Duquesne Dukes football players
Indiana Hoosiers football coaches
Iowa Pre-Flight Seahawks football coaches
Los Angeles Bulldogs players
United States Navy pilots of World War II
People from Chisholm, Minnesota
Coaches of American football from Minnesota
Players of American football from Minnesota
Military personnel from Minnesota